Mitchell County is one of the 141 Cadastral divisions of New South Wales. It contains the town of Collingullie. The Murrumbidgee River is the northern boundary.

Mitchell County is named in honour of the Surveyor-General Sir Thomas Livingstone Mitchell (1792-1855).

Parishes within this county
A full list of parishes found within this county; their current LGA and mapping coordinates to the approximate centre of each location is as follows:

References

Counties of New South Wales